Chenkilath is a small village in Pathanapuram, Pathanapuram Taluk, Kollam district, Kerala state, India.  Most inhabitants are Christians.  Bethel AG Church is a local landmark.

References 

Villages in Kollam district